Matta is a genus of araneomorph spiders in the family Tetrablemmidae that was first described by C. R. Crosby in 1934.

Species
 it contains ten species, found in Mexico and Brazil:
Matta angelomachadoi Brescovit, 2005 – Brazil
Matta cambito Brescovit & Cizauskas, 2019 – Brazil
Matta hambletoni Crosby, 1934 (type) – Brazil
Matta humhum Brescovit & Cizauskas, 2019 – Brazil
Matta humrrum Brescovit & Cizauskas, 2019 – Brazil
Matta mckenziei Shear, 1978 – Mexico
Matta nuusga Brescovit & Cizauskas, 2019 – Brazil
Matta pititinha Brescovit & Cizauskas, 2019 – Brazil
Matta teteia Brescovit & Cizauskas, 2019 – Brazil
Matta zuiuda Brescovit & Cizauskas, 2019 – Brazil

See also
 List of Tetrablemmidae species

References

Araneomorphae genera
Spiders of South America
Tetrablemmidae